UFC 189: Mendes vs. McGregor was a mixed martial arts event held on July 11, 2015, at the MGM Grand Garden Arena in Las Vegas, Nevada.

Background
The event took place during the UFC's annual International Fight Week.

The event was expected to be headlined by a UFC Featherweight Championship bout between the then champion José Aldo and Conor McGregor. On June 23, it was reported that Aldo suffered a rib fracture and pulled out of the bout in light of the injury. On June 30, it was confirmed that Aldo indeed pulled out of the bout and that the interim championship bout would take place at this event. The bout remained the event headliner. On July 1, photographs of Aldo's scans were released and indicated that he had indeed suffered a fractured rib. On July 10, White claimed that Aldo did not have a broken rib as "every x-ray he sent out was of an old injury". He reaffirmed that Aldo had a "bruised rib and cartilage" and that the biggest problem was the weight cutting process being complicated by the injury. They later fought at UFC 194.

The co-main event featured a UFC Welterweight Championship bout between then champion Robbie Lawler and top contender Rory MacDonald. Their first fight at UFC 167 ended in a split decision victory for Lawler.

Matt Brown was briefly linked to a bout with Nate Diaz at the event.  However, in mid-April, Brown announced that the pairing had been scrapped. Brown remained on the card against Tim Means.

A welterweight bout between Jake Ellenberger and Stephen Thompson was initially expected to take place at this event. However, in mid-May, the bout was made the main event of The Ultimate Fighter: American Top Team vs. Blackzilians Finale which took place a day later at the same venue.

John Hathaway was expected to face Gunnar Nelson at the event. However, on June 23, Hathaway pulled out of the bout due to an injury. This prompted a shift in another welterweight bout on the card as Brandon Thatch was pulled from his fight against John Howard to face Nelson, while Cathal Pendred was announced as Howard's new opponent. Pendred had previously fought only 28 days before the event, when he defeated Augusto Montaño at UFC 188.

Jeremy Stephens missed weight on his first attempt, coming in 3.5 lb overweight at 149.5 lb. After having made no attempts to cut further, he was fined 20 percent of his fight purse, which went to Dennis Bermudez.

Results

Bonus awards
The following fighters were awarded $50,000 bonuses:
Fight of the Night: Robbie Lawler vs. Rory MacDonald
Performance of the Night: Conor McGregor and Thomas Almeida

Reported payout
The following is the reported payout to the fighters as reported to the Nevada State Athletic Commission. It does not include sponsor money and also does not include the UFC's traditional "fight night" bonuses.
 Conor McGregor: $500,000 (no win bonus) def. Chad Mendes: $500,000
 Robbie Lawler: $300,000 (includes $150,000 win bonus) def. Rory MacDonald: $59,000
 Jeremy Stephens: $72,000 (includes $40,000 win bonus) def. Dennis Bermudez: $34,000 ^
 Gunnar Nelson: $58,000 (includes $29,000 win bonus) def. Brandon Thatch: $22,000
 Thomas Almeida: $24,000 (includes $12,000 win bonus) def. Brad Pickett: $30,000
 Matt Brown: $92,000 (includes $46,000 win bonus) def. Tim Means: $23,000
 Alex Garcia: $30,000 (includes $15,000 win bonus) def. Mike Swick: $48,000
 John Howard: $42,000 (includes $21,000 win bonus) def. Cathal Pendred: $10,000
 Cody Garbrandt: $20,000 (includes $10,000 win bonus) def. Henry Briones: $10,000
 Louis Smolka: $30,000 (includes $15,000 win bonus) def. Neil Seery: $10,000
 Cody Pfister: $20,000 (includes $10,000 win bonus) def. Yosdenis Cedeno: $13,000

^ Jeremy Stephens was fined 20 percent of his purse ($8,000) for failing to make the required weight for his fight with Dennis Bermudez.  That money was issued to Bermudez, an NSAC official confirmed.

Records set
The event's weigh-ins took place before a record crowd estimated at 11,500.

The event had a $7,200,000 gate, which broke the record for a mixed martial arts event in the United States. The final attendance for the event was 16,019, a record for Nevada, which had hosted 91 prior UFC events.

Lawler vs. MacDonald
Robbie Lawler vs. Rory MacDonald was named 2015's Fight of the Year by Sherdog and MMA Fighting.

Milestones
This was the first event to feature the UFC's Reebok fight kits, which were announced on December 2, 2014 and officially revealed on June 30, 2015.

For the main event, the entrance music was performed live. Sinéad O'Connor sang "Foggy Dew" for McGregor and Aaron Lewis and his band played "Country Boy" for Mendes.

See also
List of UFC events
2015 in UFC

References

Ultimate Fighting Championship events
2015 in mixed martial arts
Mixed martial arts in Las Vegas
MGM Grand Garden Arena
July 2015 sports events in the United States